Röchling shells were bunker-busting artillery shells, developed by German engineer August Cönders during World War II, based on the theory of increasing the sectional density to improve penetration.

Description 
However, these shells had a low muzzle velocity, and thus a high dispersion,  on  range. As a result, they saw very limited use during World War II; only about 200 shells were ever fired even though 6000 such shells were made for the very large howitzers like the 21 cm mortar.

Röchling shells were developed for the 21 cm Mörser 18, a captured French 34 cm railway gun 674(f), and the 35.5 cm Haubitze M1 only. In addition, many experimental HE shells were made for the 37 mm PAK and 50 mm PAK weapons.

Use 
Röchling shells were tested in 1942 and 1943 first against the Belgian Fort de Battice then against the Belgian Fort d'Aubin-Neufchâteau. They were also tested against the fortresses of Hůrka, Hanička and Dobrošov (today's Czech Republic), the Gössler wall, Toplitzsee (Austria) and at the Hillersleben test facility (Germany).

They were regarded as a German secret weapon, and there is speculation that their use was limited in order to reduce the chance of dud shells being recovered and exploited by the Allied forces. A more likely reason, however, is their poor accuracy.

Preserved small-size prototype of Röchling shell (36 cm long) is since 2020 exhibited in the Museum of Czechoslovakian fortifications, inside the fort Hůrka (cz). Remnants of full-sized test shells are still visible in the walls of the fort.

See also 
 Kinetic energy penetrator
 Impact depth

References

Artillery shells
Anti-fortification weapons
Weapons and ammunition introduced in 1942